"Tusk" is a song by British-American rock band Fleetwood Mac from the 1979 double LP of the same name. The song peaked at number eight in the United States for three weeks, reached number six in the United Kingdom (where it was certified Silver for sales of over 250,000 copies), number five in Canada, and number three in Australia.

The single was released with two different picture sleeves in many territories: the first featured the black and white picture of producer/engineer Ken Caillat's dog Scooter snapping at a trouser leg, the same as that used for the album cover, whilst the second featured a plain cover with the same font as the album cover but without the dog picture. A limited promotional 12-inch version, featuring mono and stereo versions, was also released to US radio stations.

A slightly different mix of the track appeared on the retrospective four-disc compilation 25 Years – The Chain in 1992.

History
Looking for a title track for the as yet unnamed album, Mick Fleetwood suggested that they take the rehearsal riff that Lindsey Buckingham used for sound-checks. Producers Richard Dashut and Ken Caillat then created a drum-driven production. In addition to the standard drum kit, Fleetwood Mac also experimented with different found sounds on the song. Fleetwood and Buckingham played lamb chops and a Kleenex box on the track respectively. 

At the request of Mick Fleetwood, the band recruited the University of Southern California's Trojan Marching Band to play on the single. A mobile studio was installed in Los Angeles' Dodger Stadium to record the marching band. The recording session took place on June 4, 1979. Some recorded footage of the session made it into the song's music video. John McVie was in Tahiti during the Dodger Stadium recording, but he is represented in the video by a cardboard cutout carried around by Mick Fleetwood and later positioned in the stands with the other band members.

The Trojan Marching Band's contributions set a record for the highest number of musicians performing on a single. At the time, the marching band had 112 members. During a game at the Los Angeles Memorial Coliseum on October 4, 1980, Lindsey Buckingham, Stevie Nicks, and Mick Fleetwood presented the Trojan Band with a platinum disc for their contributions on "Tusk". The song was also performed with the Trojan Band during Fleetwood Mac's 1997 concert for the recording of the live album The Dance.

For the Tusk Tour, the band used an Oberheim four-voice synthesizer played by keyboard tech Jeffery Sova to cover the horn parts. An OB-X with a cassette interface was kept backstage if the Four-Voice broke down. Christine McVie, who expected to play a percussion part for live renditions of "Tusk", instead opted to play the accordion. "I never planned on learning the accordion...It was just laying around the stage one day. I wasn't sure what I was going to play on 'Tusk'. I thought I might wind up playing some kind of percussion, but I just picked it up and started doing the riff."

In 2014, it was featured on the soundtrack of Kevin Smith's movie of the same name.

Reception
Billboard described Tusk as "an eerie combination of vocals and a heavy percussion track." Billboard suggested that it was "not as accessible" as other Fleetwood Mac songs and that it was more difficult to "get a handle" on the hook.  Cash Box said it "may mystify some with its droning drum beat, the inclusion of the USC Marching Band and dissonant break" but it has a mesmerizing quality." Record World called it "a unique departure" for the band and said that "The drum-led rhythm and chant-like vocals merge into a thick tribal dance."

Personnel
 Lindsey Buckingham – guitars, Kleenex box, vocals
 Christine McVie – electric piano, backing vocals
 Stevie Nicks – backing vocals
 John McVie – bass guitar
 Mick Fleetwood – drums, percussion, lamb chops

Additional personnel

 USC Trojan Marching Band – percussion, horns, woodwinds

Charts

Weekly charts

Year-end charts

Certifications

References

External links 
 
 
 
 

Fleetwood Mac songs
1979 singles
Songs written by Lindsey Buckingham
Songs about dancing
Song recordings produced by Ken Caillat
Song recordings produced by Richard Dashut
Warner Records singles
1979 songs